Sally Hitchiner (born 1980) is an English Anglican priest.

Early life and education
Sally Ann Hitchiner was born on 14 February 1980. From 1998 to 2001, she studied anthropology and social policy at the University of York where she achieved a first class honours. She then studied theology and trained for ordination at Wycliffe Hall, Oxford, an Evangelical Anglican theological college.

Ordained ministry
In 2008 Hitchiner became the Chaplain's Assistant at St Peter's College, Oxford and at the Oxford Pastorate chaplaincy where she reinvented the Oxford University Socratic Society, debating philosophy and theology with those of different beliefs.

Hitchiner served her curacy at St John's Church, Ealing from 2009 to 2012, during which time she led the church's Sunday evening Cafe Church congregation with a special focus on those who did not feel comfortable in mainstream church settings. She was involved in coordinating the local community response to the London riots in 2011, and a year later led the call towards forgiveness and reconciliation.
She developed an unlikely friendship with Richard Dawkins following jointly sitting with him as the subject for the semi-final of the Sky Arts National Portrait of the Year competition which was aired in December 2014

Hitchiner contributed a chapter on mission to a book celebrating the voices of ordained women who had become national experts

Up until April 2019 she was Coordinating Anglican Chaplain and Interfaith Adviser at Brunel University. Since then, she has been Associate Vicar for Ministry at St Martin-in-the-Fields, London.

Personal life and views on LGBT rights
On 15 July 2014, Hitchiner was accidentally outed during a live appearance on television. Hitchiner opposes "gay-to-straight" conversion therapy and the Church of England's official stance against same-sex marriage. She is the founder of Diverse Church, a movement for young LGBT adults. She stated on BBC Breakfast on 3 September 2016 that she had recently become engaged to be Civilly Partnered, and she was united in a civil partnership with Fiona. Clergy in the Church of England are permitted to enter into same-sex civil partnerships.

Hitchiner advocates all sides in the debate working together constructively towards increased inclusion of LGBT people within the church and society.

In 2014 Hitchiner founded Diverse Church a national support group for 18–30 year old LGBT+ Christians. This group specialises in supporting those in the most conservative ends of the church and welcomes all 18–30 year old LGBT Christians whatever their views are on ethics or theology. It places a high value on confidentiality and there is no need to come out beyond the group when you join.

References

Living people
21st-century English Anglican priests
British LGBT rights activists
LGBT Anglican clergy
1980 births